Karen Mulhallen (born 1942 in Woodstock, Ontario, Canada) is a Canadian educator, poet, essayist, critic and editor. She taught English at Ryerson University from 1967 to 2014. She served as the poetry review editor of The Canadian Forum from 1974 to 1979, and their features editor from 1975 to 1988. In 1973, Mulhallen became editor-in-chief of Descant until its closure in 2015.

Biography
She received her BA in 1963 from Waterloo Lutheran University, (now Wilfrid Laurier University) her MA (English) in 1967, and PhD (English) in 1975, both from the University of Toronto. 

For 42 years, Karen Mulhallen was editor-in-chief of Descant, a Toronto-based quarterly journal of poetry, prose and visual arts. During that time, the magazine won six Canadian National Magazine Awards and the Litho Award for Outstanding Achievement in the Printing Industry.

Until her retirement in 2014, Dr. Mulhallen, a William Blake scholar, was a professor of English at Ryerson University in Toronto  and an adjunct professor at the University of Toronto, Department of English.

Early in her career Karen Mulhallen was shy about submitting her work for publication until she became involved with Descant (magazine) in the early 1970s. A prolific writer, she has published 18 books of poetry, a number of edited volumes and dozens of essays and academic articles on the arts both in Canada and in the UK. In 2010 she organized and chaired a symposium, "Blake In Our Time: A Symposium Celebrating the Future of Blake Studies & the Legacy of G.E. Bentley Jr."

Karen Mulhallen has been called a metaphysical poet. Her most recent book of poetry, Code Orange: An Emblazoned Suite is a bilingual edition (French/English) translated by Nancy Huston (Black Moss Press, 2015).

Her papers are archived at the University of Calgary and at the Thomas Fisher Rare Book Library, University of Toronto.

Selected book publications 
Poetry
 Captive Love, A Memoir of Rescue, Polyphonic, Quattro Books, December 2017
 Seasons in an Unknown Key, Tightrope Books, 2017
 Code Orange: An Emblazoned Suite, bilingual edition with Nancy Huston, Black Moss Press, 2015
 Fishing Poems, Black Moss Press, 2014 
 The Pillow Books, Black Moss Press, 2011
 Acquainted With Absence, Selected Poems. Ed. and Introduction by Douglas Glover, Blaurock Press, 2009
 Sea Horses, Black Moss Press, 2007
 Renga Talk, Pasdeloup Press, 2007. Limited Edition of 12 copies. (dialogue poems with Virgil Burnett)
 Sea Light, Black Moss Press, 2003
 Leifr’s Story, Pasdeloup Press, 2002. Illustrated by Helen Edmonds.
 The Grace of Private Passage, Black Moss Press, 2000
 Herm on Tour, Pasdeloup Press, 1998
 The Caverns of Ely, Pasdeloup Press, 1997
 War Surgery, A Jazz Catafalque, Black Moss Press, 1996
 A Sentimental Dialogue, Pasdeloup Press, 1996 [with Virgil Burnett]
 In the Era of Acid Rain, Black Moss Press, 1993
 Modern Love, Poems 1970-1989, Black Moss Press, 1990
 Sheba and Solomon, Eleftheria Press, 1984

Edited volumes
 Remember Me! Blake In Our Time A Keepsake Book In Celebration of An Exhibition and Symposium on the Life and Art of William Blake (1757-1827), Victoria University, Toronto, Toronto, Victoria University Library, 2010
 Blake In Our Time, Essays in Honour of G.E. Bentley Jr. ed. and intro., Toronto, University of Toronto Press, 2010
 Beyond The 49th Parallel: Writing The New Canadian Fiction, ed. and intro., Istanbul and Ankara, Turkey, Yapi Kredi Sanat, 2004 
 Paper Guitar; Twenty-Seven Writers Celebrate Twenty-Five Years of Descant magazine, ed., Toronto, HarperCollins, 1995
 Views from the North, An Anthology of Travel Writing, ed., The Porcupine's Quill, 1984
 Tasks of Passion: Dennis Lee at Mid-Career, Toronto, Descant Editions, 1982. Edited with Donna Bennett, and Russell Brown.

References

1942 births
Living people
Wilfrid Laurier University alumni
University of Toronto alumni
Academic staff of Toronto Metropolitan University
Canadian educators